Holud Pakhir Dana (English: The Yellow Wings) is a 2013 Bengali film, directed by Kanoj Das and produced by Bidu Das under the banner of Dapro Film Production. The film features actors Dibyendu Mukherjee and Rimjhim Gupta in the lead roles. Surojit Chatterjee composed the music for this film. It released on 12 April 2013.

Plot
Riju is a doctor who was severely harmed when he was hit by a car. The car belonged to Saheli, who is also a doctor. Saheli then tried to nurse Riju so that he regained his health. She kept Riju at her residence for a period and as days passed, they fell in love. When Riju returned home, he discovered that his mother had died. He then went to Mathurapur when a doctor called him from there to inform him many villagers were ill due to consumption of spurious liquor. On the other hand, Saheli learned that she had cancer and went to the "Painless Life Centre" and stayed there. Riju tried to find out the whereabouts of Saheli one day since they had not been in touch for a long time. He landed up at the Centre one day and took Saheli back home as he wanted her to be by his side during her last days. She died a few days later.

Cast

Main
 Dibyendu Mukherjee as Riju
 Rimjhim Gupta as Saheli

Supporting
 Sabyasachi Chakraborty as Dr Anirban
 Sonia Kohli as Doctor
 Anuradha Ray as Riju's mother
 Kalyani Mondal as Saheli's mother
 Ramen Raychowdhury as a doctor
 Monu Mukhopadhyay as the servant in Riju's house
 Nimai Ghosh
 Bidyut Das
 Sangeeta Sanyal

Soundtrack

The soundtrack of Holud Pakhir Dana has been composed by Surojit Chatterjee. The music release took place on 29 March 2013 at the South City Mall auditorium in the presence of All India Trinamool Congress M.P. Arup Biswas.

Track listing

Critical reception

Holud Pakhir Dana received mostly negative remarks from reviewers. Gomolo users rated it 2 out of 5 stars. Aditya Chakrabarty of Gomolo said, "Films made by Kanoj Das have had much stronger lines and social messages in the past, but this film is an exception. This is one soppy tearjerker and neither the story nor the performances are strong to hold your attention."

Controversy

Members of the Bengali band Cactus claimed that the title Holud Pakhir Dana was inspired from their popular number "Holud Pakhi" and complained that the film gave no credits to the band.

Band member Sidhu said, "It's undoubtedly inspired from our track. Tomorrow, someone might come up with a title like Bhebe Dekhechho Ki and not give credit to "Mohiner Ghoraguli". We are not asking for royalty, but credit where it's due. In between, a film called Sudhu Tumi Elena had released. Everyone knows we also have a song by that name."

Drummer Baji said, ""Holud Pakhi" is not just popular amongst the younger generation. Even those who do not follow music, also know about the song."

References

Bengali-language Indian films
2010s Bengali-language films